Allsvenskan 1996, part of the 1996 Swedish football season, was the 72nd Allsvenskan season played. IFK Göteborg won the league ahead of runners-up Malmö FF, while Umeå FC, Djurgårdens IF and IK Oddevold were relegated.

League table

Relegation play-offs

Results

Season statistics

Top scorers

References 

Print
 
 
 

Online
 
 

Allsvenskan seasons
Swed
Swed
1